Ivan Crnov (born 1 February 1990) is a Bosnian born-Croatian professional footballer, currently playing for Slovenian second tier side Krka.

Honours
Gorica
2. HNL: 2010–11

Zrinjski Mostar
Bosnian Premier League: 2013–14

Sheriff Tiraspol
Moldovan Super Cup: 2015

Željezničar
Bosnian Cup: 2017–18

References

External links

1990 births
Living people
People from Gornji Vakuf
Croats of Bosnia and Herzegovina
Association football midfielders
Association football wingers
Croatian footballers
NK Croatia Sesvete players
HNK Gorica players
HŠK Zrinjski Mostar players
FC Sheriff Tiraspol players
NK Široki Brijeg players
FK Željezničar Sarajevo players
FK Krupa players
NK Triglav Kranj players
FK Borac Banja Luka players
HNK Cibalia players
NK Sesvete players
NK Krka players
Croatian Football League players
First Football League (Croatia) players
Premier League of Bosnia and Herzegovina players
Slovenian PrvaLiga players
Slovenian Second League players
Croatian expatriate footballers
Expatriate footballers in Moldova
Croatian expatriate sportspeople in Moldova
Expatriate footballers in Slovenia
Croatian expatriate sportspeople in Slovenia